John Wicks may refer to:

 John Wicks (singer), singer and songwriter with the UK band The Records
 John Wicks (drummer), American studio session drummer 
 Johnny Lee Wicks (died 2010), perpetrator of the 2010 Las Vegas courthouse shooting
 John F. Wick, organist and founder of the Wicks Organ Company

See also
 Jan Wyck, or Wick, Dutch baroque painter
 John Wick (disambiguation)
 Wicks (disambiguation)